Rashid Ali is a singer, guitarist, musician and composer, who first became known for the hit song Kabhi Kabhi Aditi from Jaane Tu Ya Jaane Na.

Personal life
Born in Hyderabad, India and brought up in London, his father is a retired businessman and mother is a ghazal singer who trained with Ustad Ghulam Mustafa Khan. Rashid's sensibility towards music has been multi-ethnic and diverse, and although he had basic training on the rhythm guitar for one year, he taught himself all aspects of playing the lead guitar and improvisation by listening to all genres of music, in particular Jazz fusion, Spanish and Latin music. He never had any vocal lessons either and has a natural ability to sing.

Professional life
Rashid was spotted at a concert in London by A R Rahman. He was then invited by A R Rahman to be a part of Unity of Light Concert where he performed a jazz centric fusion of 'Ooh La La La' and has been a regular feature of A R Rahman shows since then. He started doing vocals for A R Rahman for the first time in Parthale Paravasam in 2002. He has sung two songs in Jaane Tu Ya Jaane Na which became chartbusters and earned him nominations for best playback male singer for Filmfare,Stardust, Star Screen Awards and Radio Mirchi Awards 2008/2009. His recent hits are "Call Me Dil" and "Cry Cry" from Jhootha Hi Sahi. He is also a guitarist by profession and is usually associated with Rahman in his film songs including playing guitar and singing Kabhi Kabhi Aditi ( also creating that special guitar line which was placed at the intro of the song), Ishq Ada Hai and most recently the steel string rhythm guitar on Call Me Dil song from Jhootha Hi Sahi.

Rashid has finished working on his own debut album titled 'Call Me Rashid' which will introduce some original music. The album has been produced by A R Rahman under his own label KM Music. The music has been composed and arranged by Rashid Ali. Bollywood actress Tabu is making her debut in a music video through this album. The first taster preview of the album with a duet with Rashid and a singer from Dhaka Bangladesh, Faria Chaudhary, was posted on A R Rahman's Facebook page on 22 December 2010. The clip was from an adapted Hindi version of the song Ayriliq meaning Separation, a traditional folk song from Azerbaijan.

Rashid's Album titled "Call Me Rashid" has been launched by Artist Aloud (Headed by Hungama Digital Media Ltd) on 28 November 2011. Samples of the song have also been posted on the main website KM Musiq as well as on www.artistaloud.com. The live performance broadcast of the launch has been released on YouTube along with the album which is available currently downloadable online and the CD of the album on T-Series will be available by the end of February 2012 across music stores in India. He has also sung the song "Sun Lo Zara" with Shreya Goshal and Timmy for the film 'Ek Deewana Tha' which released in February 2012.

On 1 November 2012, he performed with A R Rahman in Bhopal, India in celebration of the foundation of Madhya Pradesh. In 2013, Rashid has decided to position himself in Mumbai a lot more and shortly after arriving in India recorded a romantic number for another film soundtrack composed by A R Rahman entitled, "Raanjhanaa". The song is his first duet with Neeti Mohan entitled, "Nazar Laaye" and the film was released on 21 June 2013.

In response to people loving the song, "Nazar Laaye" which featured the voices of Rashid Ali and Neeti Mohan, Rashid got to work to write a special single featuring Neeti Mohan called "Tu Hai (Autumn Love)" on which he played all the instruments and produced it. This was released in December 2013 and is available as a Free Download exclusively from Rashid's website, www.rashidali.com.

In November 2014, Rashid has launched his own Digital Interactive YouTube Video Content Venture Called " Rashid's Jam Room", where he shows off his Solo Guitar skills, his voice as well as collaborations with New and Recognised Artists.The first unique video launched was a one take in 10 different styles on solo Acoustic Guitar version of a version of Hotel California which received rave reviews not only because of this version was largely improvised but for the first time ever featured Rashid playing this version in 10 different genres in one single take. Rashid also has a dedicated space in this venture to discuss techniques and tips for the Guitar. The Jam Room will continue into 2015 with lots more coming.

In 2015, Rashid collaborated with
One of the most respected sitarists, Niladri Kumar releasing 
His own explosive and energetic instrumental composition, “Head to the Heart”, a high paced original jugalbandi between the Acoustic Guitar and the Zitar.

Discography

References

External links
 

Year of birth missing (living people)
Living people
Indian male playback singers
Bollywood playback singers
Indian guitarists
Singers from Hyderabad, India